Traddie Simpson (born 28 July 1970) is a former Bermudian cricketer. Simpson was a left-handed batsman who bowled left-arm fast-medium.

In January 2008, Bermuda were again invited to part in the 2008 Stanford 20/20, where Simpson made a single Twenty20 appearance against Guyana in the first round. Bermuda made 62/9 from their twenty overs, with Brangman ending the innings not out on 1. In Guyana's successful chase, Traddie took the wicket of Travis Dowlin, ending with figures of 1/21 from three overs.

References

External links
Traddie Simpson at ESPNcricinfo
Traddie Simpson at CricketArchive

1970 births
Living people
Bermudian cricketers